Philip Raymond Lammens (born 1977) is a United States magistrate judge of the United States District Court for the Middle District of Florida and is a former nominee to be a United States district judge of the United States District Court for the Northern District of Florida.

Biography

Lammens received his Bachelor of Arts, cum laude, in 1999 from the University of Florida. He received a Juris Doctor, Order of the Coif and magna cum laude, in 2002, from the Fredric G. Levin College of Law at the University of Florida. He began his legal career serving as a law clerk to Judge William Terrell Hodges of the United States District Court for the Middle District of Florida, from 2002 to 2004. He served as a law clerk to Judge Joel Fredrick Dubina of the United States Court of Appeals for the Eleventh Circuit, from 2004 to 2005. He worked in the United States Department of Justice’s Civil Division's Torts Branch Constitutional and Specialized Tort Litigation Section, from 2005 to 2006. From 2006 to 2008, he served as Assistant General Counsel for the City of Jacksonville's Office of General Counsel. From 2008 to 2012, he served as an Assistant United States Attorney for the United States Attorney's Office for the Middle District of Florida. He has served as a United States magistrate judge for the United States District Court for the Middle District of Florida since 2012.

Expired nomination to district court

On April 28, 2016, President Obama nominated Lammens to serve as a United States District Judge of the United States District Court for the Northern District of Florida, to the seat vacated by Judge John Richard Smoak, Jr., who took senior status on December 31, 2015. His nomination expired on January 3, 2017, with the end of the 114th Congress.

References

1977 births
Living people
21st-century American judges
21st-century American lawyers
Assistant United States Attorneys
Florida lawyers
Fredric G. Levin College of Law alumni
People from Queens, New York
United States magistrate judges
University of Florida alumni